Bothriocyrtum californicum, the California trapdoor spider, is a species of spider in the family Halonoproctidae. It is found in the United States.

References

External links

 

Halonoproctidae
Articles created by Qbugbot
Spiders described in 1874